Arden, Nevada was an unincorporated community in Clark County, Nevada. The area is now part of the town of Enterprise.

History
The San Pedro, Los Angeles and Salt Lake Railroad (later part of the Union Pacific Railroad) began operating through the area in 1905. By 1906, Arden was serving as a shipping point for the Potosi mine.

The Arden post office was established in 1907. Around that time, William K. Moore, who has been credited as Arden's founder, discovered gypsum deposits in the nearby mountains. With financing from Southern California businessmen, Moore started the Arden Plaster Company, which opened a mill at the site in 1908. It was reported to be the second largest gypsum plant in the country.

The plaster plant burned down in 1912, but was quickly rebuilt. In 1919, it was purchased by the United States Gypsum Company. The plant was closed and dismantled in 1930 due to a decline in the construction industry.

A railroad spur line was built in 1925 to connect Arden to the Blue Diamond Mine,  to the northwest.

A commercial operation has since resumed operations at the site. 

Clark County built a fallout shelter at Arden in the 1950s or 1960s to house regional government leaders in case of an attack on Las Vegas. The shelter was maintained at least until the 1980s.

On April 21, 1958, United Airlines Flight 736, a Douglas DC-7 passenger aircraft with 47 aboard. crashed onto then-empty desert two miles SE of Arden after a mid-air collision with a United States Air Force F-100 jet fighter flown by two pilots.

  All 49 aboard the two aircraft were killed.

The Arden post office was closed in 1971. In 1981, Arden was reported to have around 40 residents.

References

1905 establishments in Nevada
Populated places established in 1905
Unincorporated communities in Clark County, Nevada
Unincorporated towns in Nevada
Unincorporated communities in Nevada